Aleyrodinae is a subfamily of whiteflies in the family Aleyrodidae.

Genera
 Acanthaleyrodes Takahashi, 1931
 Acanthobemisia Takahashi, 1935
 Acaudaleyrodes Takahashi, 1951
 Acutaleyrodes Takahashi, 1960
 Africaleurodes Dozier, 1934
 Agrostaleyrodes Ko, 2001
 Aleurocanthus Quaintance & Baker, 1914
 Aleurocerus Bondar, 1923
 Aleurochiton Tullgren, 1907
 Aleuroclava Singh, 1931
 Aleurocybotus Quaintance & Baker, 1914
 Aleurocyperus Ko & Dubey, 2007
 Aleuroduplidens Martin, 1999
 Aleuroglandulus Bondar, 1923
 Aleuroinanis Martin, 1999
 Aleurolobus Quaintance & Baker, 1914
 Aleurolonga Mound, 1965
 Aleuromarginatus Corbett, 1935
 Aleuropapillatus Regu & David, 1993
 Aleuroparadoxus Quaintance & Baker, 1914
 Aleuroplatus Quaintance & Baker, 1914
 Aleuropleurocelus Drews & Sampson, 1956
 Aleuroporosus Corbett, 1935
 Aleuropteridis Mound, 1961
 Aleuroputeus Corbett, 1935
 Aleurothrixus Quaintance & Baker, 1914
 Aleurotithius Quaintance & Baker, 1914
 Aleurotrachelus Quaintance & Baker, 1914
 Aleurotuba Tremblay & Iaccarino, 1978
 Aleurotulus Quaintance & Baker, 1914
 Aleuroviggianus Iaccarino, 1982
 Aleurovitreus Martin, 2005
 Aleyrodes Latreille, 1796
 Aleyrodiella Danzig, 1966
 Anomaleyrodes Takahashi & Mamet, 1952
 Apobemisia Takahashi, 1954
 Arachnaleyrodes Bink-Moenen, 1983
 Asialeyrodes Corbett, 1935
 Asterobemisia Trehan, 1940
 Asterochiton Maskell, 1879
 Axacalia Danzig, 1969
 Bellitudo Russell, 1943
 Bemisaleyrodes Cohic, 1969
 Bemisia Quaintance & Baker, 1914
 Bemisiella Danzig, 1966
 Brazzaleyrodes Cohic, 1966
 Bulgarialeurodes Corbett, 1936
 Calluneyrodes Zahradnik, 1961
 Chitonaleyrodes Martin, 1999
 Cockerelliella Sundararaj & David, 1992
 Cohicaleyrodes Bink-Moenen, 1983
 Combesaleyrodes Cohic, 1966
 Corbettia Dozier, 1934
 Crenidorsum Russell, 1945
 Crescentaleyrodes David & Jesudasan, 1987
 Cryptolingula Martin & Carver, 1999
 Davidiella Dubey & Sundararaj, 2005
 Dialeurodes Cockerell, 1902
 Dialeurolobus Danzig, 1964
 Dialeurolonga Dozier, 1928
 Dialeuropora Quaintance & Baker, 1917
 Dialeurotrachelus Takahashi, 1942
 Disiphon Russell, 1993
 Distinctaleyrodes Dubey & Sundararaj, 2006
 Dothioia Dumbleton, 1961
 Dumbletoniella Jesudasan & David, 1990
 Editaaleyrodes David, 2005
 Extensaleyrodes Bink-Moenen, 1983
 Fascaleyrodes Bink-Moenen, 1983
 Filicaleyrodes Takahashi, 1962
 Fippataleyrodes Sundararaj & David, 1992
 Gagudjuia Martin, 1999
 Gomenella Dumbleton, 1961
 Harpaleyrodes Bink-Moenen, 1983
 Hesperaleyrodes Sampson, 1943
 Heteraleyrodes Takahashi, 1942
 Heterobemisia Takahashi, 1957
 Indoaleyrodes David & Subramaniam, 1976
 Juglasaleyrodes Cohic, 1966
 Keralaleyrodes Meganathan & David, 1994
 Laingiella Corbett, 1926
 Leucopogonella Dumbleton, 1961
 Lipaleyrodes Takahashi, 1962
 Malayaleyrodes Corbett, 1935
 Marginaleyrodes Takahashi, 1961
 Massilieurodes Goux, 1939
 Metabemisia Takahashi, 1963
 Metaleyrodes Sampson, 1943
 Minutaleyrodes Jesudasan & David, 1990
 Mixaleyrodes Takahashi, 1936
 Nealeyrodes Hempel, 1922
 Neoaleurodes Bondar, 1923
 Neoaleurotrachelus Takahashi & Mamet, 1952
 Neomaskellia Quaintance & Baker, 1913
 Neopealius Takahashi, 1954
 Nigrasialeyrodes Martin & Carver, 1999
 Orchamoplatus Russell, 1958
 Orientaleyrodes David, 1993
 Orstomaleyrodes Cohic, 1966
 Papillipes Bink-Moenen, 1983
 Parabemisia Takahashi, 1952
 Paraleurolobus Sampson & Drews, 1941
 Paulianaleyrodes Cohic, 1966
 Pealius Quaintance & Baker, 1914
 Pectinaleyrodes Bink-Moenen, 1983
 Pentaleyrodes Takahashi, 1937
 Peracchius Lima & Racca-Filho, 2005
 Plataleyrodes Takahashi & Mamet, 1952
 Pogonaleyrodes Takahashi, 1955
 Pseudaleurolobus Hempel, 1922
 Pseudaleuroplatus Martin, 1999
 Pseudaleyrodes Hempel, 1922
 Pseudozaphanera Manzari, 2006
 Ramsesseus Zahradnik, 1970
 Rhachisphora Quaintance & Baker, 1917
 Rosanovia Danzig, 1969
 Rugaleyrodes Bink-Moenen, 1983
 Rusostigma Quaintance & Baker, 1917
 Russellaleyrodes David, 1973
 Septaleurodicus Sampson, 1943
 Setaleyrodes Takahashi, 1931
 Simplaleurodes Goux, 1945
 Singhiella Sampson, 1943
 Singhius Takahashi, 1932
 Siphoninus Silvestri, 1915
 Sphericaleyrodes Selvakumaran & David, 1996
 Tegmaleurodes Martin, 2005
 Tetraleurodes Cockerell, 1902
 Tetralicia Harrison, 1917
 Trialeurodes Cockerell, 1902
 Trialeurolonga Martin, 2005
 Trichoaleyrodes Takahashi & Mamet, 1952
 Tuberaleyrodes Takahashi, 1932
 Vasantharajiella P.M.M. David, 2000
 Vasdavidius Russell, 2000
 Venezaleurodes Russell, 1967
 Viennotaleyrodes Cohic, 1968
 Xenaleyrodes Takahashi, 1936
 Xenobemisia Takahashi, 1951
 Yleyrodes Bink-Moenen, 1983
 Zaphanera Corbett, 1926

References

Hemiptera
Hemiptera subfamilies